Airport T1 is a Barcelona Metro station that serves terminal T1 of Barcelona–El Prat Airport, in the municipality of El Prat de Llobregat, to the southwest of Barcelona. It is the southern terminus of the airport branch of Barcelona Metro line 9 (L9) and is operated by Transports Metropolitans de Barcelona (TMB).

Opened in 2016, the station is located underneath the airport terminal and consists of two levels. The trains run on the lower level, where there is a  island platform featuring screen doors. Adjacent to the station is a depot that can accommodate 12 trains. A new commuter rail link is projected to reach the station around 2018.

History 
The completion of the station's main structure was part of the construction of terminal T1, which opened in June 2009.

When the terminal opened, the airport branch of L9 was expected to be ready for passenger service in 2012. In March 2012, however, the Government of Catalonia announced that the opening date for the  section of the line between the airport terminals and Zona Universitària station would be postponed until 2014. The first day of passenger service was 12 February 2016.

Train service 
Additional partial services may be added if necessary, reducing the frequency to 4 minutes. Passengers using the metro stations located at the airport terminals are required to purchase a special ticket known as an airport ticket; basic single tickets issued by the operating company Transports Metropolitans de Barcelona (TMB) are not valid. The airport ticket costs €4.50 and also gives access to the rest of the TMB-operated Barcelona Metro system. Multiple-use tickets and unlimited passes issued by the Autoritat del Transport Metropolità (ATM)—a public agency in charge of coordinating public transportation operators in the Barcelona area—are valid, with the exception of the T-10 ten-trip ticket.

Future
Commuter rail services to central Barcelona will also serve the station once a new airport rail link is built. Construction work for the new link began in July 2015, originally with completion expected in 2018, with opening currently expected around 2022.

References

External links

 Aeroport T1 listing at the Transports Metropolitans de Barcelona (TMB) website
 Information and photos of the station at trenscat.cat

Airport railway stations in Spain
Barcelona Metro line 9 stations
Railway stations in El Prat de Llobregat
Railway stations in Spain opened in 2016